Stênio may refer to:

 Stênio Garcia, Brazilian actor
 Stênio (footballer, born 1994) (Stênio Garcia Dutra), Brazilian football player
 Stênio Júnior, Brazilian football player
 Stênio Yamamoto, Brazilian sport shooter
 Stênio (footballer, born 2003) (Stênio Zanetti Toledo), Brazilian footballer